Burkhanov or Burkhanova (also transliterated Burhonov/Burhonova) is a family name of Uzbek origin meaning "son/daughter of Burhan". It may refer to:

Shukur Burkhanov (1910–1987), Soviet theatre and film actor
Mutal Burhonov (1916–2002), Soviet-Uzbek composer
Sofiya Burkhanova (born 1989), Uzbekistani shot putter

Uzbek-language surnames